Tallula atrifascialis is a species of pyralid moth in the family Pyralidae.

The MONA or Hodges number for Tallula atrifascialis is 5591.

References

Further reading

External links

 

Epipaschiinae
Moths described in 1886